"(I Just) Died in Your Arms" is the debut single by the English pop rock band Cutting Crew, released in July 1986 as a single from their debut studio album, Broadcast. The song was written by frontman Nick Van Eede, produced by Terry Brown, John Jansen and the band, and mixed at Utopia Studios in London by Tim Palmer.

The power ballad is the band's biggest hit, peaking at number one in the United States, Canada, Norway, and Finland, and reaching the top five in the UK, South Africa, Sweden, and Switzerland.

Background and writing
The words "I just died in your arms tonight" allegedly came to Van Eede while he was having sex with his girlfriend, the French phrase la petite mort, or "the little death", being a metaphor for orgasm. After writing down his version of the phrase, he later used it as the opening line to the song as well as using it as the chorus.

Music video
There were two music videos produced. The North American version featured artistic fragmented shots using a model, with the band performing to camera. The UK version was filmed in a studio, both in color as well as black and white, while only the latter had been made available in Apple Music stores, from countries like Canada and Brazil.

On 29 October 2020, Van Eede announced, through Cutting Crew's official Facebook page, that a remastered HD edition of the "UK  version" music video was uploaded to the band's former Vevo official account on YouTube.

2020 reissue 
In early 2020, the song was rerecorded and reissued as in an orchestral incarnation as well as in several other versions as the lead single for the second Cutting Crew compilation album, Ransomed Healed Restored Forgiven, accompanied by a new music video uploaded to YouTube, through the official account of the band's new label, August Day. The new release for the hit has been through an 8-track EP released to digital platforms. There is also a physical release, on CD, offered as a solo release and also included as part of the limited deluxe version of the new greatest hits album, both sold through the band's official webstore.

Chart performance
First released in Britain, the song peaked at number four on the UK charts in September 1986. Upon its release in the United States, the previously unknown band's debut single shot to number one on 2 May 1987, and stayed there for two weeks. It also reached number four on the Hot Mainstream Rock Tracks chart, number 24 on Billboards Hot Adult Contemporary Tracks chart and (in a remix version) number 37 on the Hot Dance/Club Play chart. The song spent three weeks at number one in Canada.

Weekly charts

Year-end charts

Certifications

References

1986 songs
1986 debut singles
1987 singles
1995 singles
Cutting Crew songs
Smokie (band) songs
Trust Company (band) songs
Jason Donovan songs
Bastille (band) songs
Songs written by Nick Van Eede
Rock ballads
Billboard Hot 100 number-one singles
Cashbox number-one singles
Number-one singles in Finland
Number-one singles in Norway
Number-one singles in Poland
RPM Top Singles number-one singles
Virgin Records singles
Black-and-white music videos
1980s ballads